The platypus (Ornithorhynchus anatinus), sometimes referred to as the duck-billed platypus, is a semiaquatic, egg-laying mammal endemic to eastern Australia, including Tasmania. The platypus is the sole living representative or  monotypic taxon of its family (Ornithorhynchidae) and genus (Ornithorhynchus), though a number of related species appear in the fossil record.

Together with the four species of echidna, it is one of the five extant species of monotremes, mammals that lay eggs instead of giving birth to live young. Like other monotremes, it senses prey through electrolocation. It is one of the few species of venomous mammals, as the male platypus has a spur on the hind foot that delivers a venom, capable of causing severe pain to humans. The unusual appearance of this egg-laying, duck-billed, beaver-tailed, otter-footed mammal baffled European naturalists when they first encountered it, and the first scientists to examine a preserved platypus body (in 1799) judged it a fake, made of several animals sewn together.

The unique features of the platypus make it an important subject in the study of evolutionary biology, and a recognisable and iconic symbol of Australia. It is culturally significant to several Aboriginal peoples of Australia, who also used to hunt the animal for food. It has appeared as a mascot at national events and features on the reverse of the Australian twenty-cent coin, and the platypus is the animal emblem of the state of New South Wales. Until the early 20th century, humans hunted the platypus for its fur, but it is now protected throughout its range. Although captive-breeding programs have had only limited success, and the platypus is vulnerable to the effects of pollution, it is not under any immediate threat.

, the platypus is a legally protected species in all states where it occurs. It is listed as an endangered species in South Australia and vulnerable in Victoria. The species is classified as a near-threatened species by the IUCN, but a November 2020 report has recommended that it is upgraded to threatened species under the federal EPBC Act, due to habitat destruction and declining numbers in all states.

Taxonomy and naming

When the platypus was first encountered by Europeans in 1798, a pelt and sketch were sent back to Great Britain by Captain John Hunter, the second Governor of New South Wales. British scientists' initial hunch was that the attributes were a hoax. George Shaw, who produced the first description of the animal in the Naturalist's Miscellany in 1799, stated it was impossible not to entertain doubts as to its genuine nature, and Robert Knox believed it might have been produced by some Asian taxidermist. It was thought that somebody had sewn a duck's beak onto the body of a beaver-like animal. Shaw even took a pair of scissors to the dried skin to check for stitches.

Shaw initially assigned the species the Linnaean name Platypus anatinus when he described it, but the genus term was quickly discovered to already be in use as the name of the wood-boring ambrosia beetle genus Platypus. It was independently described as Ornithorhynchus paradoxus by Johann Blumenbach in 1800 (from a specimen given to him by Sir Joseph Banks) and following the rules of priority of nomenclature, it was later officially recognised as Ornithorhynchus anatinus.

There is no universally-agreed plural form of "platypus" in the English language. Scientists generally use "platypuses" or simply "platypus". Colloquially, the term "platypi" is also used for the plural, although this is a form of pseudo-Latin; going by the word's Greek roots the plural would be "platypodes". Early British settlers called it by many names, such as "watermole", "duckbill", and "duckmole". Occasionally it is specifically called the "duck-billed platypus".

The scientific name Ornithorhynchus anatinus literally means 'duck-like bird-snout', deriving its genus name from the Greek root  ( ornith or  órnīs 'bird') and the word  ( 'snout', 'beak'). Its species name is derived from Latin  ('duck-like') from  'duck'. The platypus is the sole living representative or  monotypic taxon of its family (Ornithorhynchidae).

Description

In David Collins's account of the new colony 1788–1801, he describes coming across "an amphibious animal, of the mole species". His account includes a drawing of the animal.

The body and the broad, flat tail of the platypus are covered with dense, brown, biofluorescent fur that traps a layer of insulating air to keep the animal warm. The fur is waterproof, and the texture is akin to that of a mole. The platypus uses its tail for storage of fat reserves (an adaptation also found in animals such as the Tasmanian devil). The webbing on the feet is more significant on the front feet and is folded back when walking on land. The elongated snout and lower jaw are covered in soft skin, forming the bill. The nostrils are located on the dorsal surface of the snout, while the eyes and ears are located in a groove set just back from it; this groove is closed when swimming. Platypuses have been heard to emit a low growl when disturbed and a range of other vocalisations have been reported in captive specimens.

Males average  in total length, while females average , with substantial variation in average size from one region to another. This pattern does not seem to follow any particular climatic rule and may be due to other environmental factors, such as predation and human encroachment.

The platypus has an average body temperature of about  rather than the  typical of placental mammals. Research suggests this has been a gradual adaptation to harsh environmental conditions on the part of the small number of surviving monotreme species rather than a historical characteristic of monotremes.

Modern platypus young have three teeth in each of the maxillae (one premolar and two molars) and dentaries (three molars), which they lose before or just after leaving the breeding burrow; adults have heavily keratinised pads called ceratodontes in their place, which they use to grind food. The first upper and third lower cheek teeth of platypus nestlings are small, each having one principal cusp, while the other teeth have two main cusps. The platypus jaw is constructed differently from that of other mammals, and the jaw-opening muscle is different. As in all true mammals, the tiny bones that conduct sound in the middle ear are fully incorporated into the skull, rather than lying in the jaw as in pre mammalian synapsids. However, the external opening of the ear still lies at the base of the jaw. The platypus has extra bones in the shoulder girdle, including an interclavicle, which is not found in other mammals. As in many other aquatic and semiaquatic vertebrates, the bones show osteosclerosis, increasing their density to provide ballast. It has a reptilian gait, with the legs on the sides of the body, rather than underneath. When on land, it engages in knuckle-walking on its front feet, to protect the webbing between the toes.

Venom

While both male and female platypuses are born with ankle spurs, only the spurs on the male's back ankles deliver venom,
composed largely of defensin-like proteins (DLPs), three of which are unique to the platypus. The DLPs are produced by the immune system of the platypus. The function of defensins is to cause lysis in pathogenic bacteria and viruses, but in platypuses they also are formed into venom for defence. Although powerful enough to kill smaller animals such as dogs, the venom is not lethal to humans, but the pain is so excruciating that the victim may be incapacitated. Oedema rapidly develops around the wound and gradually spreads throughout the affected limb. Information obtained from case histories and anecdotal evidence indicates the pain develops into a long-lasting hyperalgesia (a heightened sensitivity to pain) that persists for days or even months. Venom is produced in the crural glands of the male, which are kidney-shaped alveolar glands connected by a thin-walled duct to a calcaneus spur on each hind limb. The female platypus, in common with echidnas, has rudimentary spur buds that do not develop (dropping off before the end of their first year) and lack functional crural glands.

The venom appears to have a different function from those produced by non-mammalian species; its effects are not life-threatening to humans, but nevertheless powerful enough to seriously impair the victim. Since only males produce venom and production rises during the breeding season, it may be used as an offensive weapon to assert dominance during this period.

Similar spurs are found on many archaic mammal groups, indicating that this is an ancient characteristic for mammals as a whole, and not exclusive to the platypus or other monotremes.

Electrolocation

Monotremes are the only mammals (apart from at least one species of dolphin-- the Guiana Dolphin) known to have a sense of electroreception: they locate their prey in part by detecting electric fields generated by muscular contractions. The platypus's electroreception is the most sensitive of any monotreme.

The electroreceptors are located in rostrocaudal rows in the skin of the bill, while mechanoreceptors (which detect touch) are uniformly distributed across the bill. The electrosensory area of the cerebral cortex is contained within the tactile somatosensory area, and some cortical cells receive input from both electroreceptors and mechanoreceptors, suggesting a close association between the tactile and electric senses. Both electroreceptors and mechanoreceptors in the bill dominate the somatotopic map of the platypus brain, in the same way human hands dominate the Penfield homunculus map.

The platypus can determine the direction of an electric source, perhaps by comparing differences in signal strength across the sheet of electroreceptors. This would explain the characteristic side-to-side motion of the animal's head while hunting. The cortical convergence of electrosensory and tactile inputs suggests a mechanism that determines the distance of prey that, when they move, emit both electrical signals and mechanical pressure pulses. The platypus uses the difference between arrival times of the two signals to sense distance.

Feeding by neither sight nor smell, the platypus closes its eyes, ears, and nose each time it dives. Rather, when it digs in the bottom of streams with its bill, its electroreceptors detect tiny electric currents generated by muscular contractions of its prey, so enabling it to distinguish between animate and inanimate objects, which continuously stimulate its mechanoreceptors. Experiments have shown the platypus will even react to an "artificial shrimp" if a small electric current is passed through it.

Monotreme electrolocation probably evolved in order to allow the animals to forage in murky waters, and may be tied to their tooth loss. The extinct Obdurodon was electroreceptive, but unlike the modern platypus it foraged pelagically (near the ocean surface).

Eyes
In recent studies it has been suggested that the eyes of the platypus are more similar to those of Pacific hagfish or Northern Hemisphere lampreys than to those of most tetrapods. The eyes also contain double cones, which most mammals do not have.

Although the platypus's eyes are small and not used under water, several features indicate that vision played an important role in its ancestors. The corneal surface and the adjacent surface of the lens is flat while the posterior surface of the lens is steeply curved, similar to the eyes of other aquatic mammals such as otters and sea-lions. A temporal (ear side) concentration of retinal ganglion cells, important for binocular vision, indicates a role in predation, while the accompanying visual acuity is insufficient for such activities. Furthermore, this limited acuity is matched by a low cortical magnification, a small lateral geniculate nucleus and a large optic tectum, suggesting that the visual midbrain plays a more important role than the visual cortex, as in some rodents. These features suggest that the platypus has adapted to an aquatic and nocturnal lifestyle, developing its electrosensory system at the cost of its visual system; an evolutionary process paralleled by the small number of electroreceptors in the short-beaked echidna, which dwells in dry environments, whilst the long-beaked echidna, which lives in moist environments, is intermediate between the other two monotremes.

Biofluorescence
In 2020, research in biofluorescence revealed that the platypus glows a bluish-green color when exposed to black light.

Distribution, ecology, and behaviour

The platypus is semiaquatic, inhabiting small streams and rivers over an extensive range from the cold highlands of Tasmania and the Australian Alps to the tropical rainforests of coastal Queensland as far north as the base of the Cape York Peninsula.

Inland, its distribution is not well known. It was considered extinct on the South Australian mainland, with the last sighting recorded at Renmark in 1975, until some years after John Wamsley had created Warrawong Sanctuary (see below) in the 1980s, setting a platypus breeding program there, and it had subsequently closed. In 2017 there were some unconfirmed sightings downstream, outside the sanctuary, and in October 2020 a nesting platypus was filmed inside the recently reopened sanctuary. There is a population on Kangaroo Island introduced in the 1920s, which was said to stand at 150 individuals in the Rocky River region of Flinders Chase National Park before the 2019–20 Australian bushfire season, in which large portions of the island burnt, decimating all wildlife. However, with the SA Department for Environment and Water recovery teams working hard to reinstate their habitat, there had been a number of sightings reported by April 2020.

The platypus is no longer found in the main part of the Murray-Darling Basin, possibly due to the declining water quality brought about by extensive land clearing and irrigation schemes. Along the coastal river systems, its distribution is unpredictable; it appears to be absent from some relatively healthy rivers, and yet maintains a presence in others, for example, the lower Maribyrnong, that are quite degraded.

In captivity, platypuses have survived to 17 years of age, and wild specimens have been recaptured when 11 years old. Mortality rates for adults in the wild appear to be low. Natural predators include snakes, water rats, goannas, hawks, owls, and eagles. Low platypus numbers in northern Australia are possibly due to predation by crocodiles. The introduction of red foxes in 1845 for hunting may have had some impact on its numbers on the mainland. The platypus is generally regarded as nocturnal and crepuscular, but individuals are also active during the day, particularly when the sky is overcast. Its habitat bridges rivers and the riparian zone for both a food supply of prey species, and banks where it can dig resting and nesting burrows.

The platypus is an excellent swimmer and spends much of its time in the water foraging for food. It has a very characteristic swimming style and no external ears. Uniquely among mammals, it propels itself when swimming by an alternate rowing motion of the front feet; although all four feet of the platypus are webbed, the hind feet (which are held against the body) do not assist in propulsion, but are used for steering in combination with the tail. The species is endothermic, maintaining its body temperature at about 32°C (90°F), lower than most mammals, even while foraging for hours in water below 5°C (41°F).

Dives normally last around 30 seconds, but can last longer, although few exceed the estimated aerobic limit of 40 seconds. Recovery at the surface between dives commonly takes from 10 to 20 seconds.

When not in the water, the platypus retires to a short, straight resting burrow of oval cross-section, nearly always in the riverbank not far above water level, and often hidden under a protective tangle of roots.

The average sleep time of a platypus is said to be as long as 14 hours per day, possibly because it eats crustaceans, which provide a high level of calories.

Diet
The platypus is a carnivore: it feeds on annelid worms, insect larvae, freshwater shrimp, and freshwater yabby (crayfish) that it digs out of the riverbed with its snout or catches while swimming. It uses cheek-pouches to carry prey to the surface, where it is eaten. The platypus needs to eat about 20% of its own weight each day, which requires it to spend an average of 12 hours daily looking for food.

Reproduction

When the platypus was first encountered by European naturalists, they were divided over whether the female lays eggs. This was finally confirmed by William Hay Caldwell's team in 1884.

The species exhibits a single breeding season; mating occurs between June and October, with some local variation taking place between different populations across its range. Historical observation, mark-and-recapture studies, and preliminary investigations of population genetics indicate the possibility of both resident and transient members of populations, and suggest a polygynous mating system. Females are thought likely to become sexually mature in their second year, with breeding confirmed still to take place in animals over nine years old.

The male takes no part in caring for his young, and retreats to his year-long burrow. The female softens the ground in the burrow with dead, folded, wet leaves, and she fills the nest at the end of the tunnel with fallen leaves and reeds for bedding material. This material is dragged to the nest by tucking it underneath her curled tail.

The female platypus has a pair of ovaries, but only the left one is functional. The platypus's genes are a possible evolutionary link between the mammalian XY and bird/reptile ZW sex-determination systems because one of the platypus's five X chromosomes contains the DMRT1 gene, which birds possess on their Z chromosome. The eggs develop in utero for about 28 days, with only about 10 days of external incubation (in contrast to a chicken egg, which spends about one day in tract and 21 days externally). After laying her eggs, the female curls around them. The incubation period is divided into three phases. In the first phase, the embryo has no functional organs and relies on the yolk sac for sustenance. The yolk is absorbed by the developing young. During the second phase, the digits develop, and in the last phase, the egg tooth appears.

Most mammal zygotes go through holoblastic cleavage, meaning that, following fertilization, the ovum is split due to cell divisions into multiple, divisible daughter cells. This is in comparison to the more ancestral process of meroblastic cleavage, present in monotremes like the platypus and in non-mammals like reptiles and birds. In meroblastic cleavage, the ovum does not split completely. This causes the cells at the edge of the yolk to be cytoplasmically continuous with the egg's cytoplasm. This allows the yolk, which contains the embryo, to exchange waste and nutrients with the cytoplasm.

There is no official term for platypus young, but the term "platypup" sees unofficial use, as does "puggle". Newly hatched platypuses are vulnerable, blind, and hairless, and are fed by the mother's milk. Although possessing mammary glands, the platypus lacks teats. Instead, milk is released through pores in the skin. The milk pools in grooves on her abdomen, allowing the young to lap it up. After they hatch, the offspring are milk-fed for three to four months. During incubation and weaning, the mother initially leaves the burrow only for short periods, to forage. When doing so, she creates a number of thin soil plugs along the length of the burrow, possibly to protect the young from predators; pushing past these on her return forces water from her fur and allows the burrow to remain dry. After about five weeks, the mother begins to spend more time away from her young, and at around four months, the young emerge from the burrow. A platypus is born with teeth, but these drop out at a very early age, leaving the horny plates it uses to grind food.

Evolution

The platypus and other monotremes were very poorly understood, and some of the 19th century myths that grew up around themfor example, that the monotremes were "inferior" or quasireptilianstill endure. In 1947, William King Gregory theorised that placental mammals and marsupials may have diverged earlier, and a subsequent branching divided the monotremes and marsupials, but later research and fossil discoveries have suggested this is incorrect. In fact, modern monotremes are the survivors of an early branching of the mammal tree, and a later branching is thought to have led to the marsupial and placental groups. Molecular clock and fossil dating suggest platypuses split from echidnas around 19–48million years ago.

The oldest discovered fossil of the modern platypus dates back to about 100,000 years ago, during the Quaternary period. The extinct monotremes Teinolophos and Steropodon were once thought to be closely related to the modern platypus, but are now considered more basal taxa. The fossilised Steropodon was discovered in New South Wales and is composed of an opalised lower jawbone with three molar teeth (whereas the adult contemporary platypus is toothless). The molar teeth were initially thought to be tribosphenic, which would have supported a variation of Gregory's theory, but later research has suggested, while they have three cusps, they evolved under a separate process. The fossil is thought to be about 110million years old, making it the oldest mammal fossil found in Australia. Unlike the modern platypus (and echidnas), Teinolophos lacked a beak.

Monotrematum sudamericanum, another fossil relative of the platypus, has been found in Argentina, indicating monotremes were present in the supercontinent of Gondwana when the continents of South America and Australia were joined via Antarctica (until about 167million years ago). A fossilised tooth of a giant platypus species, Obdurodon tharalkooschild, was dated 5–15million years ago. Judging by the tooth, the animal measured 1.3 metres long, making it the largest platypus on record.

Because of the early divergence from the therian mammals and the low numbers of extant monotreme species, the platypus is a frequent subject of research in evolutionary biology. In 2004, researchers at the Australian National University discovered the platypus has ten sex chromosomes, compared with two (XY) in most other mammals. These ten chromosomes form five unique pairs of XY in males and XX in females, i.e. males are XYXYXYXYXY. One of the X chromosomes of the platypus has great homology to the bird Z chromosome. The platypus genome also has both reptilian and mammalian genes associated with egg fertilisation. Though the platypus lacks the mammalian sex-determining gene SRY, a study found that the mechanism of sex determination is the AMH gene on the oldest Y chromosome. A draft version of the platypus genome sequence was published in Nature on 8May 2008, revealing both reptilian and mammalian elements, as well as two genes found previously only in birds, amphibians, and fish. More than 80% of the platypus's genes are common to the other mammals whose genomes have been sequenced. An updated genome, the most complete on record, was published in 2021, together with the genome of the short-beaked echidna.

Conservation

Status and threats
Except for its loss from the state of South Australia, the platypus occupies the same general distribution as it did prior to European settlement of Australia. However, local changes and fragmentation of distribution due to human modification of its habitat are documented. Its historical abundance is unknown and its current abundance difficult to gauge, but it is assumed to have declined in numbers, although as of 1998 was still being considered as common over most of its current range. The species was extensively hunted for its fur until the early years of the 20th century and, although protected throughout Australia since 1905, until about 1950 it was still at risk of drowning in the nets of inland fisheries.

The International Union for Conservation of Nature recategorised its status as "near threatened" in 2016. The species is protected by law, but the only state in which it is listed as endangered is South Australia, under the National Parks and Wildlife Act 1972. In 2020 it has been recommended to be listed as a vulnerable species in Victoria under the state's Flora and Fauna Guarantee Act 1988.

Habitat destruction
The platypus is not considered to be in immediate danger of extinction, because conservation measures have been successful, but it could be adversely affected by habitat disruption caused by dams, irrigation, pollution, netting, and trapping. Reduction of watercourse flows and water levels through excessive droughts and extraction of water for industrial, agricultural, and domestic supplies are also considered a threat. The IUCN lists the platypus on its Red List as "Near Threatened" as assessed in 2016, when it was estimated that numbers had reduced by about 30 percent on average since European settlement. The animal is listed as endangered in South Australia, but it is not covered at all under the federal EPBC Act.

Researchers have worried for years that declines have been greater than assumed. In January 2020, researchers from the University of New South Wales presented evidence that the platypus is at risk of extinction, due to a combination of extraction of water resources, land clearing, climate change and severe drought. The study predicted that, considering current threats, the animals' abundance would decline by 47%–66% and metapopulation occupancy by 22%–32% over 50 years, causing "extinction of local populations across about 40% of the range". Under projections of climate change projections to 2070, reduced habitat due to drought would lead to 51–73% reduced abundance and 36–56% reduced metapopulation occupancy within 50 years respectively. These predictions suggested that the species would fall under the "Vulnerable" classification. The authors stressed the need for national conservation efforts, which might include conducting more surveys, tracking trends, reduction of threats and improvement of river management to ensure healthy platypus habitat. Co-author Gilad Bino is concerned that the estimates of the 2016 baseline numbers could be wrong, and numbers may have been reduced by as much as half already.

A November 2020 report by scientists from the University of New South Wales, funded by a research grant from the Australian Conservation Foundation in collaboration with the World Wildlife Fund Australia and the Humane Society International Australia revealed that that platypus habitat in Australia had shrunk by 22 per cent in the previous 30 years, and recommended that the platypus should be listed as a threatened species under the EPBC Act. Declines in population had been greatest in NSW, in particular in the Murray-Darling Basin.

Disease
Platypuses generally suffer from few diseases in the wild; however, as of 2008 there was concern in Tasmania about the potential impacts of a disease caused by the fungus Mucor amphibiorum. The disease (termed mucormycosis) affects only Tasmanian platypuses, and had not been observed in platypuses in mainland Australia. Affected platypuses can develop skin lesions or ulcers on various parts of their bodies, including their backs, tails, and legs. Mucormycosis can kill platypuses, death arising from secondary infection and by affecting the animals' ability to maintain body temperature and forage efficiently. The Biodiversity Conservation Branch at the Department of Primary Industries and Water collaborated with NRM north and University of Tasmania researchers to determine the impacts of the disease on Tasmanian platypuses, as well as the mechanism of transmission and spread of the disease.

Wildlife sanctuaries

Much of the world was introduced to the platypus in 1939 when National Geographic Magazine published an article on the platypus and the efforts to study and raise it in captivity. The latter is a difficult task, and only a few young have been successfully raised since, notably at Healesville Sanctuary in Victoria. The leading figure in these efforts was David Fleay, who established a platypusary (a simulated stream in a tank) at the Healesville Sanctuary, where breeding was successful in 1943. In 1972, he found a dead baby of about 50 days old, which had presumably been born in captivity, at his wildlife park at Burleigh Heads on the Gold Coast, Queensland. Healesville repeated its success in 1998 and again in 2000 with a similar stream tank. Since 2008, platypus has bred regularly at Healesville, including second-generation (captive born themselves breeding in captivity). Taronga Zoo in Sydney bred twins in 2003, and breeding was again successful there in 2006.

Captivity
As of 2019, the only platypuses in captivity outside of Australia are in the San Diego Zoo Safari Park in the U.S. state of California. Three attempts were made to bring the animals to the Bronx Zoo, in 1922, 1947, and 1958; of these, only two of the three animals introduced in 1947 lived longer than eighteen months.

Human interactions

Usage

Aboriginal Australians used to hunt platypuses for food (their fatty tails being particularly nutritious), while, after colonisation, Europeans hunted them for fur from the late 19th century and until 1912, when it was prohibited by law. In addition, European researchers captured and killed platypus or removed their eggs, partly in order to increase scientific knowledge, but also to gain prestige and outcompete rivals from different countries.

Cultural references

The platypus has been a subject in the Dreamtime stories of Aboriginal Australians, some of whom believed the animal was a hybrid of a duck and a water rat.

According to one story of the upper Darling River, the major animal groups, the land animals, water animals and birds, all competed for the platypus to join their respective groups, but the platypus ultimately decided to not join any of them, feeling that he did not need to be part of a group to be special, and wished to remain friends with all of those groups. Another Dreaming story emanate of the upper Darling tells of a young duck which ventured too far, ignoring the warnings of her tribe, and was kidnapped by a large water-rat called Biggoon. After managing to escape after some time, she returned and laid two eggs which hatched into strange furry creatures, so they were all banished and went to live in the mountains.

The platypus is also used by some Aboriginal peoples as a totem, which is to them "a natural object, plant or animal that is inherited by members of a clan or family as their spiritual emblem", and the animal holds special meaning as a totem animal for the Wadi Wadi people, who live along the Murray River. Because of their cultural significance and importance in connection to country, the platypus is protected and conserved by these Indigenous peoples.

The platypus has often been used as a symbol of Australia's cultural identity. In the 1940s, live platypuses were given to allies in the Second World War, in order to strengthen ties and boost morale.

Platypuses have been used several times as mascots: Syd the platypus was one of the three mascots chosen for the Sydney 2000 Olympics along with an echidna and a kookaburra, Expo Oz the platypus was the mascot for World Expo 88, which was held in Brisbane in 1988, and Hexley the platypus is the mascot for the Darwin operating system, the BSD-based core of macOS and other operating systems from Apple Inc.

Since the introduction of decimal currency to Australia in 1966, the embossed image of a platypus, designed and sculpted by Stuart Devlin, has appeared on the reverse (tails) side of the 20-cent coin. The platypus has frequently appeared in Australian postage stamps, most recently the 2015 "Native Animals" series and the 2016 "Australian Animals Monotremes" series.

In the American animated series Phineas and Ferb (2007–2015), the title characters own a pet bluish-green platypus named Perry who, unknown to them, is a secret agent. Such choices were inspired by media underuse, as well as to exploit the animal's striking appearance; additionally, show creator Dan Povenmire, who also wrote the character's theme song, said that its opening lyrics are based on the introductory sentence of the Platypus article on Wikipedia, copying the "semiaquatic egg-laying mammal" phrase word for word, and appending the phrase "of action". As a character, Perry has been well received by both fans and critics. Coincidentally, real platypuses show a similar cyan color when seen under ultraviolet lighting.

See also
 Henry Burrell
Ellis Joseph
 Fauna of Australia
 Venomous mammal

Citations

References

Books

Documentaries
  DVD EAN 9398710245592

External links

 Biodiversity Heritage Library bibliography for Ornithorhynchus anatinus
 Platypus facts
 View the platypus genome in Ensembl

Ornithorhynchidae
Monotremes
Semiaquatic mammals
Electroreceptive animals
Mammals of New South Wales
Mammals of Queensland
Mammals of South Australia
Mammals of Tasmania
Mammals of Victoria (Australia)
Venomous mammals
Articles containing video clips
Extant Miocene first appearances
Quaternary animals of Australia
Quaternary animals of Oceania
Mammals described in 1799
Taxa named by George Shaw